The addax (Addax nasomaculatus), also known as the white antelope and the screwhorn antelope, is an antelope native to the Sahara Desert. The only member of the genus Addax, it was first described scientifically by Henri de Blainville in 1816. They are sexually dimorphic, as the females are smaller than the males. The colour of the coat depends on the season – in the winter, it is greyish-brown with white hindquarters and legs, and long, brown hair on the head, neck, and shoulders; in the summer, the coat turns almost completely white or sandy blonde.

The addax mainly eats grasses and leaves of any available shrubs, leguminous herbs and bushes. They are well-adapted to exist in their desert habitat, as they can live without water for long periods of time. Addax form herds of five to 20 members, consisting of both males and females. They are led by the oldest female. Due to its slow movements, the addax is an easy target for its predators: humans, lions, leopards, cheetahs and African wild dogs. Breeding season is at its peak during winter and early spring. The natural habitat of the addax are arid regions, semideserts and sandy and stony deserts.

The addax is a critically endangered species of antelope, as classified by the IUCN. Although extremely rare in its native habitat due to unregulated hunting, it is quite common in captivity. The addax was once abundant in North Africa; however it is currently only native to Chad, Mauritania, and Niger. It is extirpated from Algeria, Egypt, Libya, Sudan, and Western Sahara, but has been reintroduced into Morocco and Tunisia.

Taxonomy and naming
The scientific name of the addax is Addax nasomaculatus. This antelope was first described by French zoologist and anatomist Henri Blainville in 1816. It is placed in the monotypic genus Addax and the family Bovidae. Henri Blainville observed syntypes in Bullock's Pantherion and the Museum of the Royal College of Surgeons. English naturalist Richard Lydekker stated their type locality to be probably Senegambia, though he did not have anything to support the claim. Finally, from a discussion in 1898, it became more probable that British hunters or collectors obtained the addax from the part of the Sahara in Tunisia.

The generic name Addax is thought to be obtained from an Arabic word meaning a wild animal with crooked horns. It is also thought to have originated from a Latin word. The name was first used in 1693. The specific name nasomaculatus comes from the Latin words nasus (or the prefix naso-) meaning nose, and maculatus meaning spotted, referring to the spots and facial markings of the species. Bedouins use another name for the addax, the Arabic bakr (or bagr) al wahsh, which literally means "the cow of the wild". That name can be used to refer to other ungulates as well. The other common names of addax are "white antelope" and "screwhorn antelope".

Genetics
The addax has 29 pairs of chromosomes. All chromosomes are acrocentric except for the first pair of autosomes, which are submetacentric. The X chromosome is the largest of the acrocentric chromosomes, and the Y chromosome is medium-sized. The short and long arms of the pair of submetacentric autosomes correspond respectively to the 27th and 1st chromosomes in cattle and goats. In a study, the banding patterns of chromosomes in addax were found to be similar to those in four other species of the subfamily Hippotraginae.

History and fossil record
In ancient times, the addax occurred from northern Africa through Arabia and the Levant. Pictures in a tomb, dating back to 2500 BCE, show at least the partial domestication of the addax by the ancient Egyptians. These pictures show addax and some other antelopes tied with ropes to stakes. The number of addax captured by a person were considered an indicator of his high social and economic position in the society. The pygarg ("white-buttocked") beast mentioned in Deuteronomy 14:5 is believed to have been an addax. But today, excess poaching has resulted in the extinction of this species in Egypt since the 1960s.

Addax fossils have been found in four sites of Egypt – a 7000 BCE fossil from the Great Sand Sea, a 5000–6000 BCE fossil from Djara, a 4000–7000 BCE fossil from Abu Ballas Stufenmland and a 5000 BCE fossil from Gilf Kebir. Apart from these, fossils have also been excavated from Mittleres Wadi Howar (6300 BCE fossil), and Pleistocene fossils from Grotte Neandertaliens, Jebel Irhoud and Parc d'Hydra.

Physical description
 

The addax is a spiral-horned antelope. They are sexually dimorphic, as the females are smaller than the males.

The coloring of the addax's coat varies with the season. In the winter, it is greyish-brown with white hindquarters and legs, and long, brown hair on the head, neck, and shoulders. In the summer, the coat turns almost completely white or sandy blonde. Their head is marked with brown or black patches that form an 'X' over their noses. They have scraggly beards and prominent red nostrils. Long, black hairs stick out between their curved and spiralling horns, ending in a short mane on the neck.

The lower and middle portions of the horns are marked with a series of 30 to 35 ring-shaped ridges. The tail is short and slender, ending in a puff of black hair. The hooves are broad with flat soles and strong dewclaws to help them walk on soft sand. All four feet possess scent glands. The life span of the addax is up to 19 years in the wild, which can be extended to 25 years under captivity.

The addax closely resembles the scimitar oryx, but can be distinguished by its horns and facial markings. The addax has a brown hair tuft extending from the base of its horns to between its eyes. A white patch, continuing from the brown hair, extends until the middle of the cheek. On the other hand, the scimitar oryx has a white forehead with only a notable brown marking: a brown lateral stripe across its eyes. It differs from other antelopes by having large, square teeth like cattle and lacking the typical facial glands.

Addaxes in Souss-Massa National Park, Morocco

Parasites
The addax is most prone to parasites in moist climatic conditions. Addaxes have always been infected with nematodes in the Trichostrongyloidea and Strongyloidea superfamilies. In an exotic ranch in Texas, an addax was found host to the nematodes Haemonchus contortus and Longistrongylus curvispiculum in its abomasum, of which the former was dominant.

Behavior and ecology
These animals are mainly nocturnal, particularly in summer. In the day, they dig into the sand in shady locations and rest in these depressions, which also protect them from sandstorms. Addax herds contain both males and females, and have from five to 20 members. They will generally stay in one place and only wander widely in search of food. The addax has a strong social structure, probably based on age, and herds are led by the oldest female.  Herds are more likely to be found along the northern edge of the tropical rain system during the summer and move north as winter falls.  They are able to track rainfall and will head for these areas where vegetation is more plentiful. Males are territorial and guard females, while the females establish their own dominance hierarchies.

Due to its slow movements, the addax is an easy target for predators such as humans, lions, leopards, cheetahs and African wild dogs. Caracals, servals and hyenas attack calves. The addax is normally not aggressive, though individuals may charge if they are disturbed.

Adaptations

The addax is amply suited to live in the deep desert under extreme conditions. It can survive without free water almost indefinitely, because it gets moisture from its food and dew that condenses on plants. Scientists believe the addax has a special lining in its stomach that stores water in pouches to use in times of dehydration. It also produces highly concentrated urine to conserve water. The pale colour of the coat reflects radiant heat, and the length and density of the coat helps in thermoregulation. In the day the addax huddles together in shaded areas, and on cool nights rests in sand hollows. These practices help in dissipation of body heat and saving water by cooling the body through evaporation.

In a study, eight addaxes on a diet of grass hay (Chloris gayana) were studied to determine the retention time of food from the digestive tract. It was found that food retention time was long, taken as an adaptation to a diet including a high proportion of slow fermenting grasses; while the long fluid retention time could be interpreted to be due to water-saving mechanisms with low water turnover and a roomy rumen.

Diet

The addax lives in desert terrain where it eats grasses and leaves of what shrubs, leguminous herbs and bushes are available. Primarily a grazer, its staple foods include Aristida, Panicum, and Stipagrostis, and it will only consume browse, such as leaves of Acacia trees in the absence of these grasses. It also eats perennials which turn green and sprout at the slightest bit of humidity or rain. The addax eats only certain parts of the plant and tends to crop the Aristida grasses neatly to the same height. By contrast, when feeding on Panicum grass, the drier outer leaves are left alone while it eats the tender inner shoots and seeds. These seeds are important part of the addax's diet, being its main source of protein.

Reproduction
Females are sexually mature at 2 to 3 years of age and males at about 2 years. Breeding occurs throughout the year, but it peaks during winter and early spring. In the northern Sahara, breeding peaks at the end of winter and the beginning of spring; in the southern Sahara, breeding peaks from September to October and from January to mid-April. Each estrus bout lasts for one or two days.

In a study, the blood serum of female addaxes was analyzed through immunoassay to know about their luteal phase. Estrous cycle duration was of about 33 days. During pregnancy, ultrasonography showed the uterine horns as coiled. Each female underwent an anovulatory period lasting 39 to 131 days, during which there was no ovulation. Anovulation was rare in winter, which suggested the effect of seasons on the estrous cycle.

Gestation period lasts 257–270 days (about nine months). Females may lie or stand during the delivery, during which one calf is born. A postpartum estrus occurs after two or three days. The calf weighs  at birth and is weaned at 23–29 weeks old.

Habitat and distribution
The addax inhabits arid regions, semideserts and sandy and stony deserts. It even occurs in extremely arid areas, with less than 100 mm annual rainfall. It also inhabits deserts with tussock grasses (Stipagrostis species) and succulent thorn scrub Cornulaca. Formerly, the addax was widespread in the Sahelo-Saharan region of Africa, west of the Nile Valley and all countries sharing the Sahara Desert; but today the only known self-sustaining population is present in the Termit Massif Reserve (Niger). However, there are reports of sightings from the eastern Air Mountains (Niger) and Bodélé (Chad). Rare nomads may be seen in northern Niger, southern Algeria and Libya; and the addax is rumoured to be present along the Mali/Mauritania border, though there have been no confirmed sightings. The addax was once abundant in North Africa, native to Chad, Mauritania and Niger. It is extinct in Algeria, Egypt, Libya, Sudan and the Western Sahara. It has been reintroduced into Morocco and Tunisia.

Threats and conservation

Declines in the population of the addax have been ongoing since the mid-1800s. More recently, addaxes were found from Algeria to Sudan, but due mainly to overhunting, they have become much more restricted and rare.

Addaxes are easy to hunt due to their slow movements. Roadkill, firearms for easy hunting and nomadic settlements near waterholes (their dry-season feeding places) have also decreased their numbers. Moreover, their meat and leather are highly prized. Other threats include chronic droughts in the deserts, habitat destruction due to more human settlements and agriculture. Fewer than 500 individuals are thought to exist in the wild today, most of the animals being found between the Termit area of Niger, the Bodélé region of western Chad, and the Aoukar in Mauritania.

Today there are over 600 addaxes in Europe, Yotvata Hai-Bar Nature Reserve (Israel), Sabratha (Libya), Giza Zoo (Egypt), North America, Japan and Australia under captive breeding programmes. There are thousands more in private collections and ranches in the United States and the Middle East. Addaxes are legally protected in Morocco, Tunisia, and Algeria; hunting of all gazelles is forbidden in Libya and Egypt. Although enormous reserves, such as the Hoggar Mountains and Tasilli in Algeria, the Ténéré in Niger, the Ouadi Rimé-Ouadi Achim Faunal Reserve in Chad, and the newly established Wadi Howar National Park in Sudan, cover areas where the addax previously occurred, some do not keep addaxes at the present time because they lack the resources. The addax has been reintroduced into Bou-Hedma National Park (Tunisia) and Souss-Massa National Park (Morocco). Reintroductions in the wild are ongoing in Jebil National Park (Tunisia) and Grand Erg Oriental (the Sahara), and another is planned for Morocco.

References

External links

Grazing antelopes
Fauna of the Sahara
Mammals of Chad
Mammals of West Africa
Mammals of North Africa
Mammals described in 1816